Ohanes is a municipality of Almería province, in the autonomous community of Andalusia, Spain.

Demographics

References

External links
  Ohanes - Sistema de Información Multiterritorial de Andalucía
  Ohanes - Diputación Provincial de Almería
 The School Beam in Ohanes

Municipalities in the Province of Almería